Rachid Sfar (born September 11, 1933), is the former Prime Minister of Tunisian President Habib Bourguiba, was born in Mahdia, the ancient Fatimite capital of Tunisia.  He is the son of the Destourian leader Tahar Sfar, an associate of Bourguiba and co-founder of the Neo-Destourian Tunisian Nationalist Party in 1934. Sfar's ancestors were among the first people of Turkish origin to arrive in Tunisia during the Ottoman rule, they had arrived from Anatolia and Macedonia.

Biography 
After completing his secondary studies at the lycée in the city of Sfax, Rachid Sfar pursued advanced studies in humanities, law, and economic in Tunis and in Paris.  In Paris, he studied at the Ecole Nationale des Impôts from 1958 to 1959.

In the newly independent Tunisia, Rachid Sfar assumed various administrative responsibilities, notably in the Ministry of Finances: Director general of Taxation, Director General of Economic and Financial Relations, Director General for the Control of Tobacconists, and Secretary General of the Ministry of Finance.  In December 1977, Bourguiba called upon him to direct the Ministry of Industry of Mines and the Ministry of Energy.  In 1980, he was director of the Ministry of Defense, in 1982 the Ministry of Public Health, and from 1984 to 1986 the Ministry for the Economy.

In July 1986, before the deterioration of the financial situation in the country, President Bourguiba discharged his Prime Minister Mohamed Mzali and tasked Rachid Sfar with implementing a structural adjustment plan as Prime Minister.  Rachid Sfar re-established Tunisia's macro-economic equilibria by passing in the National Assembly the "Loi de finances complémentaire" (the supplemental finances law), by devaluing the dinar by 10%, and by obtaining support from the International Monetary Fund and the World Bank to rebuild currency reserves and re-establish credit.

President Habib Bourguiba fired Rachid Sfar on 3 October 1987. Bourguiba named his Interior Minister Zine El Abidine Ben Ali as Sfar's replacement. On November 7, 1987, invoking a provision of the Tunisian Constitution, the aged and infirm President Habib Bourguiba was declared incapable of executing the duties of his office. He was succeeded by his Prime Minister, who took the oath of office the same day before an extraordinary meeting of the National Assembly.

References

External links

Prime Ministers of Tunisia
Finance ministers of Tunisia
1933 births
Living people
Tunisian people of Turkish descent
Socialist Destourian Party politicians
Presidents of the Chamber of Deputies (Tunisia)
20th-century Tunisian politicians